Lockoneco (born 19 March 1978) is an athlete from Indonesia.  He competes in archery.

Lockoneco competed at the 2004 Summer Olympics in men's individual archery.  He was defeated in the first round of elimination, placing 45th overall.

References

1978 births
Living people
Olympic archers of Indonesia
Archers at the 2004 Summer Olympics
Archers at the 2002 Asian Games
Indonesian male archers
Asian Games competitors for Indonesia